The Permanent Representative of New Zealand to the United Nations in Geneva is New Zealand's foremost diplomatic representative at the offices of the United Nations in Geneva, and in charge of New Zealand's diplomatic mission to the United Nations in Geneva.

The Permanent Delegation is located at New Zealand's consulate-general in Geneva.  New Zealand has maintained a resident Permanent Representative to the UN in Geneva since 1961.

Permanent representatives to the United Nations in Geneva
Doug Zohrab (1961–65)
Gray Thorp (1965–68)
Helen Hampton (1968–71)
Brian Lendrum (1971–73)
Geoffrey Leonard Easterbrook-Smith (1973–77)
Ted Farnon (1977–80)
Terence O'Brien (1980–83)
Roger Peren (1983–84)
Richard Nottage (1984–87)
Graham Fortune (1987–90)
Tim Hannah (1990–91)
Alastair Bisley (1991–94)
Wade Armstrong (1994–98)
Roger Farrell (1998–2002)
Tim Caughley (2002–06 )
Don MacKay (2006–10)
Dell Higgie (2010–13)
Amanda Ellis (2013–2016)

See also
List of Permanent Representatives from New Zealand to the United Nations in New York
List of Permanent Representatives from New Zealand to the United Nations in Vienna

Notes

References
Heads of Missions List: U.  New Zealand Ministry of Foreign Affairs and Trade.  Retrieved on 2006-07-11.

United Nations Geneva, Permanent Representatives from New Zealand to
2
New Zealand
New Zealand